The Kaskawulsh Glacier is a vast, temperate valley glacier nestled in the St. Elias Mountains, within Kluane National Park in the Canadian territory of Yukon.

Geography
It terminates at the head of two river valleys, the Slims and the Kaskawulsh River, which feed the  Yukon River (via Kluane Lake) and Alsek River systems respectively.

Waterflow 
Until 2016, abundant melt water from the Kaskawulsh was channeled by ice dam to drain through the Slims River, north to Kluane Lake, and ultimately to the Bering Sea. In 2016, as the glacier receded, the predominant flow abruptly switched to the Kaskawulsh River, flowing east and then south to Alsek River and to the Gulf of Alaska. As the water level at Kluane Lake continues to drop, researchers expect this will become an isolated lake cut off from any outflow.

Tourism
Backpackers can visit the Kaskawulsh along the popular Slims River West Trail, which follows the Slims River south for  before ending at the summit of Observation Mountain near the toe of the glacier. Backpackers can also follow the Slims River East Route to reach the toe of the glacier, also known as the glacier terminus.

References

 
Glaciers of Yukon
Kluane National Park and Reserve
Saint Elias Mountains